Alan (also: Alanköy) is a village in the Göynücek District, Amasya Province, Turkey. Its population is 368 (2021).

References

Villages in Göynücek District